In cryptography, DICING is a stream cypher algorithm developed by Li An-Ping. It has been submitted to the eSTREAM Project of the eCRYPT network.

Stream ciphers